Alana Henderson (born 6 October 1988), is a Northern Irish musician, cellist, singer and songwriter from Dungannon. She released her debut EP, Wax & Wane in 2013, and her single, Let This Remain, in 2017. She is now living in Belfast.

Early life

Alana Henderson was born in Dungannon, Northern Ireland. With her family from County Armagh, Alana grew up in a very music-friendly environment, and started singing and dancing from a very young age. Alana attended St Patrick's Academy, Dungannon and picked up cello there. Alana studied Law at Queen's University, Belfast, determined to become a lawyer, but in her words, "Law was incredibly dry, quite boring and I really began to feel frustrated and so I started songwriting." After completing the degree, she eventually left to become a singer-songwriter, just before her solicitor apprenticeship started.

Music career

2013: Wax & Wane 
On 11 March 2013, Alana released her debut EP Wax & Wane, which also included "Song about a Song", "The Tower", and "Two Turtle Doves". The EP got generally positive views, including Lee Gorman of The Thin Air Magazine saying "an immensely promising first effort, which marks Alana Henderson out as one to watch".

In 2013, Alana joined The Jepettos, a Northern Irish alternative band, in their single, "Water".

2014-2016: Windfall, Touring with Hozier 

In 20 February 2014, Alana released an album called Windfall, which is "a side–project, separate from my own contemporary writing, in which I recorded an album of re–worked, contemporary arrangements of traditional songs from the North of Ireland", according to her own words. The album was shortlisted for the Northern Ireland Music Prize in 2014. Windfall is currently not available on iTunes.

Alana accompanied Hozier, an Irish singer-songwriter, on cello and vocals from late 2014 to early 2016. Together with Hozier, she played at over 300 shows, including Glastonbury, Saturday Night Live, Jools Holland, and a Grammy performance joined by Annie Lennox. Apart from cello, Alana joined the duet with Hozier for his song "In a Week" on tour, when Karen Cowley, the original singer of the song, was not present. During the tour, Alana occasionally performed her original songs as an opening act for Hozier. In July 2015, Alana played a stripped back folk set with Hozier in Newport Folk Festival, which was "a highlight of the tour" for her.

2017: Let This Remain 
On 27 October 2017, Alana released her single "Let This Remain", which was her first musical release after 2 years of touring. In 2017, Alana recorded a duet song "Holllllogram" with Joshua Burnside, a Belfast-based singer-songwriter. The song was tracked in his debut album, EPHRATA.

Acting career
In 2007, Alana starred in Seacht, which was an Irish language television soap opera, and was broadcast by TG4 and BBC Two Northern Ireland.  She starred as Caroline, a singing cello player.

Discography

Studios

Extended plays

Singles

Music videos

References 

21st-century Irish singers
Folk singers from Northern Ireland
1988 births
Singer-songwriters from Northern Ireland
People from Dungannon
Living people
Musicians from County Tyrone